OJSC Proton-PM is a Russian engine and heavy machinery manufacturing plant. It is located in the city of Perm, in the Perm Krai, on the bank of the Kama River. It started in 1958 as the specialized branch of Plant No. 19 named after I. V. Stalin for the manufacturing of the RD-214 rocket engine. In 1964 it was given made a separate entity then known as Second Production. In the later years, it has branched intro producing gas turbine power plants.

Products

Current engines
Engines in current production at the plant:
 RD-276 the latest version of the RD-275.
 RD-191 a liquid rocket engine, burning kerosene and LOX that powers the Angara (rocket) family of launch vehicles.

Former engines
Engines that are no longer produced at the plant.
 RD-214 a liquid rocket engine, burning AK-27I (a mixture of 73% Nitric acid + 27% N2O4 + iodine passivant  and TM-185 (a kerosene and gasoline mix), that powered the R-12 and Kosmos-2.
 RD-253 a liquid rocket engine, burning UDMH/N2O4 that powers the Proton first stage.
 RD-275 an improved RD-253.

Gas Turbines

 Ural-2500 gas-turbine power station (2.55 MW/ 5.82 Gcal per hour),
 Ural-4000 gas-turbine power station (4.13 MW/ 8.3 Gcal per hour),
 Ural-6000 gas-turbine power station (6.14 MW/ 11.44 Gcal per hour),
 GTES-16PA gas-turbine power station (16.3 MW/ 19.48 Gcal per hour),
 GTES-25P gas-turbine power station (23.0 MW/ 26.1 Gcal per hour).
 GTU-32P (up to 34 40 MW)

See also

NPO Energomash — The rocket engine designer that delegates some serial production to this plant.
Khrunichev State Research and Production Space Center — The Proton-M and Angara (rocket) manufacturer that delegate engine production to this plant.
Aviadvigatel — The corporate parent.

References

External links
 Proton-PM website

Aerospace companies of the Soviet Union
Companies based in Perm, Russia
Aircraft engine manufacturers of Russia
Gas turbine manufacturers
Rocket engine manufacturers of Russia
Roscosmos divisions and subsidiaries
Engine manufacturers of the Soviet Union